Tari is a census town in the Matigara CD block in the Siliguri subdivision of Darjeeling district  in the state of West Bengal, India.

Geography

Location

Bairatisal, Tari, Jitu, Bara Mohansingh and Mathapari form  a cluster of census towns as per map of Matigara CD block on page 265 of District Census Handbook, Darjeeling.

Area overview
The map alongside shows the Siliguri subdivision of Darjeeling district. This area is spread across the foothills of the Himalayas and is a plain land gently sloping from north to south. While the northern part is mentioned as the Terai region, the larger southern portion forms the western part of the Dooars region. While 55.11% per cent of the population resides in the rural areas, 44.89% resides in the urban areas. On the western side the Mechi River forms a long border with Nepal. On the eastern side the Mahananda River forms a short border with Bangladesh.

Note: The map alongside presents some of the notable locations in the subdivision. All places marked in the map are linked in the larger full screen map.

Demographics
According to the 2011 Census of India, Tari had a total population of 14,558 of which 7,335 (50%) were males and 7,223 (50%) were females. There were 2,009 persons in the age range of 0 to 6 years. The total number of literate people in Tari was 8,690 (59.69% of the population over 6 years).

Infrastructure
According to the District Census Handbook 2011, Darjiling, Tari covered an area of 1.639 km2. Among the civic amenities, it had 55 km roads with open drains, the protected water supply involved tap water from treated sources and covered well, it had 1,235 domestic electric connections and 50 road lighting points. Among the medical facilities, it had 1 dispensary/ health centre, 1 family welfare centre, 1 maternity and child welfare centre, 1 maternity home, 12 medicine shops. Among the educational facilities it had were 1 primary school, 1 middle school, the nearest secondary school, senior secondary school, general degree college at Bairatisal 1 km away.

References

Cities and towns in Darjeeling district